The 1994 Grand Prix motorcycle racing season was the 46th F.I.M. Road Racing World Championship season.

Season summary
1994 was the year in which Honda's Mick Doohan began to stamp his authority on the Grand Prix world. Honda's Longtime sponsor Rothmans left Honda to join Williams Renault in Formula One. Doohan won 9 races, the most since Giacomo Agostini won 11 in 1972. Kevin Schwantz was injured in a pre-season bicycle crash and raced in 6 races with his arm in plaster. Luca Cadalora took over from Wayne Rainey on the Yamaha and won two races. Aprilia began campaigning in the 500cc class with a 250 V twin motor enlarged to 380cc in hopes of using its lighter weight and nimble handling as an advantage.

Max Biaggi would win his first world title for Aprilia in a tight 250 class battle against Loris Capirossi and Tadayuki Okada. Kazuto Sakata won the 125 crown for Aprilia. He was the first Japanese rider to race for a European factory.

Honda secured the constructor's title in all three categories.

1994 Grand Prix season calendar
The following Grands Prix were scheduled to take place in 1994:

Calendar changes
 The European Grand Prix was moved back from 4 July to 9 October.
 The French Grand Prix returned after a one-year absence on the Bugatti Circuit in Le Mans.
 The San Marino Grand Prix was removed and the Italian Grand Prix was held at the Mugello Circuit, while the Circuito Internazionale Santa Monica was taken off the calendar.
 The FIM Grand Prix, which hosted the Jarama circuit, was taken off the calendar.

Participants

500cc participants

Results and standings

Grands Prix

500cc riders' standings

Scoring system
Points are awarded to the top fifteen finishers. A rider has to finish the race to earn points.

250cc riders' standings

Scoring system
Points are awarded to the top fifteen finishers. A rider has to finish the race to earn points.

125cc riders' standings

Scoring system
Points are awarded to the top fifteen finishers. A rider has to finish the race to earn points.

References
 

Grand Prix motorcycle racing seasons
Grand Prix motorcycle racing season